When the Cat's Away is a 1996 French drama directed by Cédric Klapisch. The movie is set in Paris and stars Garance Clavel, Zinedine Soualem, Renée Le Calm, Olivier Py, Romain Duris, Hélène de Fougerolles, Hiam Abbass and others.

Plot 
The story is about a young woman living in Paris, in the Bastille neighborhood, who has lost her cat. Through the pursuit of the cat, the film lets the spectator discover the contrasts of the district, which is evolving from a typical Parisian district to a modern and young district and the contrast between its inhabitants, among them a nice simpleton and the old women who are bored. In fact it is the story of a village in a large city, Klapisch shows once again the behaviour of an individual inside a group, as he did in Le péril jeune or Riens du tout. This time he has succeeded in joining together actors, theatre actors and residents of the district, creating a credible atmosphere that is probably the reason for the success of this film outside France.

Cast 
 Garance Clavel as Chloé
 Zinedine Soualem as Djamel
  as Madame Renée
 Olivier Py as Michel
 Simon Abkarian as Carlos
  as le peintre « Bel Canto »
 Marilyne Canto as la femme flic
 Andrée Damant as Madame Dubois
  as Madame Henriette
 Romain Duris as The drummer
 Hélène de Fougerolles as a Model
 Marine Delterme as a Model
 Eriq Ebouaney as The Cabinetmaker worker
 Hiam Abbass as a Woman

Soundtrack 
The main title "Food for Love" was composed and performed by Cqmd.

References

External links 
 

1996 films
1996 romantic comedy films
Films directed by Cédric Klapisch
Films set in Paris
French comedy films
1990s French-language films
1990s French films